Sonnet 2 is one of 154 sonnets written by the English playwright and poet William Shakespeare. It is a procreation sonnet within the Fair Youth sequence.

Structure

Sonnet 2 is an English or Shakespearean sonnet, which consists of three quatrains followed by a couplet. It follows the form's typical rhyme scheme: ABAB CDCD EFEF GG. Like all but one sonnet in the sequence, it is written in iambic pentameter, a type of poetic metre based on five pairs of metrically weak/strong syllabic positions:

 ×   /    ×     /     × /       ×  /   ×   / 
How much more praise deserved thy beauty's use, (2.9)
/ = ictus, a metrically strong syllabic position. × = nonictus.

Analysis 
Shakespeare's Sonnet 2 is the second procreation sonnet.  It urges the young man to have a child and thereby protect himself from reproach by preserving his beauty against Time's destruction.

Sonnet 2 begins with a military siege metaphor, something that occurs often in sonnets and poetry — from Virgil (‘he ploughs the brow with furrows’) and Ovid (‘furrows which may plough your body will come already’) to Shakespeare's contemporary, Drayton, “The time-plow’d furrows in thy fairest field.” The image is used here as a metaphor for a wrinkled brow. Trenches are also carved into a field when a farmer plows, and the agricultural connotation is touched on two lines later with the image of worthless weeds.

Livery is usually a uniform for a butler or soldier, which may suggest that the young man's beauty does not belong to him.

In the second quatrain, it points out that when the young man is old and asked where his beauty went, and he must then answer that his treasure is found only in his own self-absorbed “deep sunken” eyes, it would be a shame.

The third quatrain suggests that this waste and shame could be avoided if the young man were to have a child who could inherit his beauty.

Interpretations
Caroline Blakiston, for the 2002 compilation album, When Love Speaks (EMI Classics)

References

Further reading
Baldwin, T. W. On the Literary Genetics of Shakspeare's Sonnets. Urbana: University of Illinois Press, 1950.
Hubler, Edwin. The Sense of Shakespeare's Sonnets. Princeton: Princeton University Press, 1952.

External links

An analysis of the sonnet
An analysis and paraphrase of the sonnet

British poems
Sonnets by William Shakespeare